Eric Schermerhorn is an American guitarist and composer. He played with Iggy Pop on the American Caesar and  Naughty Little Doggie albums, and David Bowie on the Tin Machine  It's My Life Tour (as background vocalist and guitarist), and appeared in the video and live record Oy Vey Baby.

He later played with They Might Be Giants on Factory Showroom, Severe Tire Damage and Mono Puff's It's Fun To Steal. He also played with Seal and appeared in the video release One Night to Remember. He also has recorded with Melissa Etheridge and Ric Ocasek. He also wrote and recorded with Richard Butler of the Psychedelic Furs.

Since 1995, starting with the work on the album Hanky Panky, he became the guitarist for the band The The, replacing Johnny Marr.  
In 1998 he wrote and recorded Living in the Present Future with Eagle Eye Cherry, son of jazz trumpeter Don Cherry. He played with A1, María Gabriela Epúmer'''s band, in 1996, recorded the album Señorita Corazon. In 1999 and 2000, with Matt Johnson of The The, he co-wrote, recorded and toured the "Naked Self" record, accompanied by Earl Harvin on drums and Spencer Campbell on bass. Upon moving to Los Angeles in 2001 he wrote for Jason Mraz's first album, Waiting for My Rocket to Come. Working with Linda Perry, he wrote and recorded for Pink's Try This CD.

He joined Seal's band, and in 2003 wrote and recorded the System album as well as Seal's Live in Paris album and DVD. Sheryl Crow covered a song he co-wrote with Brian MacLeod and Bill Bottrell called "Shine over Babylon", for her Detours'' album.

He has a production company called "CHIMP" with Pete Min, the producer of "Airborne Toxic Event" in Los Angeles.

References

External links
Eric Schermerhorn's bio on This Might Be A Wiki
 

 Chimpisaband.com

American rock guitarists
American male guitarists
American session musicians
Living people
The The members
Year of birth missing (living people)